Statistical epidemiology is an emerging branch of the disciplines of epidemiology and biostatistics that aims to:
 Bring more statistical rigour to bear in the field of epidemiology 
 Recognise the importance of applied statistics, especially with respect to the context in which statistical methods are appropriate and inappropriate
 Aid and improve our interpretation of observations

Introduction 

The science of epidemiology has had enormous growth, particularly with charity and government funding.  Many researchers have been trained to conduct studies, requiring multiple skills ranging from liaising with clinical staff to the statistical analysis of complex data, such as using Bayesian methods.  The role of a Statistical Epidemiologist is to bring the most appropriate methods available to bear on observational study from medical research, requiring a broad appreciation of the underpinning methods and their context of applicability and interpretation.

The earliest mention of this phrase was in an article by EB Wilson, taking a critical look at the way in which statistical methods were developing and being applied in the science of epidemiology.

Academic recognition 

There are two Professors of Statistical Epidemiology in the United Kingdom (University of Leeds and Imperial College, London) and a Statistical Epidemiology group (Oxford University).

Related fields 

Statistical epidemiology draws upon quantitative methods from fields such as: statistics, operations research, computer science, economics, biology, and mathematics.

Journals 
 Statistics in Medicine
 Biostatistics
 The International Journal of Biostatistics
 Biometrics
 Epidemiology
 American Journal of Epidemiology
 International Journal of Epidemiology

Related societies
 The International Biometric Society
 American Statistical Association
 Royal Statistical Society
 The Biostatistics Collaboration of Australia

See also 

 Epidemiology
 Biostatistics

References

External links 
 Statistical Epidemiology webpage

Epidemiology
Demography
Biostatistics